Gaertnereae is a tribe of flowering plants in the family Rubiaceae and contains about 95 species in 2 genera. Gaertnera is found from tropical Africa to tropical Asia, while Pagamea is found in southern tropical America.

Genera 
Currently accepted names
 Gaertnera Lam. (70 sp)
 Pagamea Aubl. (25 sp)

Synonyms
Andersonia Willd. ex Schult. = Gaertnera
Fructesca DC. ex Meisn. = Gaertnera
Hymenocnemis Hook.f. = Gaertnera
Pristidia Thwaites = Gaertnera
Sykesia Arn. = Gaertnera

References

Rubioideae tribes